Lê Hữu Phát (born 11 February 1988) is Vietnamese footballer who plays for the Đồng Nai as a midfielder.

References

1988 births
Living people
Vietnamese footballers
Association football midfielders
V.League 1 players
Dong Nai FC players
Dong Thap FC players